Courcey Rovers is a Gaelic Athletic Association club based in the villages of Ballinspittle and Ballinadee in County Cork, Ireland. The club fields both hurling, Gaelic football and camogie teams. It has historically concentrated on hurling. The club is part of the Carrigdhoun division of Cork competitions. It used to be part of Carbery GAA but moved in the mid-1970s to Carrigdhoun GAA as it felt that it would be offered a higher chance to be able to win county championships, as there are more hurling clubs in the south east division. The pitch is named after hurling legend Jim O'Regan.

History
Gaelic games in Courcey's date back to the foundations of the Association itself and beyond, but up until the 1940s there were various clubs scattered in the parish ( Old Head, Kilcolman, Old Blues, Castlepark) and then two clubs in the parish from Ballinspittle and Ballinadee. 

In January 1904, the first official West Cork Board was set up. They ran off the first official West Cork Football Championship. Whereas twelve teams entered the football championship only three of those formed hurling teams, namely Bandon, Clonakilty and Skibbereen. They were joined by newly formed Kilbrittain, Shannonvale, Clogagh and Ballinadee who did not field in football. Of those original seven, Kilbrittain and Ballinadee (Courcey Rovers) have since retained hurling as their primary game.

The first draw for the West Cork Hurling Championship (part of the 1904 Championship) took place in January 1905 and resulted as Shannonvale V Clogagh; Ballinadee V Bandon; Clonakilty V Skibbereen; Kilbrittain a bye.

Bandon played Ballinadee in Bandon. The game was originally fixed for Kilbrittain but Ballinadee agreed to go to Bandon. However, when they saw the heavy state of the Bandon pitch they at first refused to play and the game was held up for an hour. When it eventually took place, Bandon were far superior, winning 5 – 9 to 0 – 0. 

It was the first recorded championship hurling game played in West Cork. The Ballinadee colures were red and white. When Ballinspittle later entered the hurling arena in the thirties, they were blue and white and became known as "The Old Blues"

Courcey Rovers GAA Club was founded in 1947 when the Ballinspittle and Ballinadee clubs agreed to merge to form one single club. The club met immediate success as in its first year it won the South West Cork Junior A and Junior B Hurling championships. Highlights over the next three decades include winning eight out of eleven South West Hurling titles from 1947 including a Five-In-A-Row and reaching the County Finals of 1957 and 1970. The defeats in those deciders were against Tracton and Cloughduv respectively.

In 1974, Courcey's made the major decision and switched from the South West (Carbery) to the South East Division (Carrigdhoun) having won Fifteen Junior A Hurling titles in less than thirty years. This was the cause of much debate at the time, and still is to this day.

But Courceys Rover's day eventually came in 2001 when they won the Carrigdhoun Junior Hurling Championship.

Courceys still remain the only club in the SE division to claim the Cork Under-21 Hurling Championship title when they defeated St Finbarrs in 1997.

In 2011, after two previous unsuccessful final appearances in eight years, Courcey Rovers finally claimed the County PIHC title and ascended to Senior status for the first time in their history. A tightly fought final encounter with Youghal finished on a scoreline of Courceys 0–15 Youghal 1–9.

Pitches
Páirc Uí Riagáin, Ballinspittle
Ballinadee Community Field, Ballinadee

Honours 
 Munster Intermediate Club Hurling Championship (0): (Runners-Up 2021)
 Munster Junior Club Hurling Championship (1): 2001
 Cork Senior A Hurling Championship (0): (Runners-Up 2022)
 Cork Premier Intermediate Hurling Championship (2): 2011, 2021 (Runners-up 2004, 2008, 2018)
 Cork Junior Hurling Championship (1): 2001 (Runners-Up 1957, 1970, 1997, 1999)
 Cork Under-21 Hurling Championship (1): 1997
 Cork Premier 2 Under-21 Hurling Championship (0): (Runners-up 2018)
 Cork Minor B Hurling Championship (0): (Runners-Up 2003)
 Cork Intermediate Hurling League (4): 2004, 2008, 2012, 2022
 Cork Minor A Football League (1): 1994 
 Carrigdhoun Junior Hurling Championship (6): 1993, 1997, 1999, 2001, 2018, 2019
 Carrigdhoun Junior Football Championship (5): 1997, 2000, 2004, 2006, 2011
 South West Junior A Hurling Championship (15): 1947, 1948, 1951, 1953, 1954, 1955, 1956, 1957, 1964, 1965, 1966, 1968, 1970, 1973, 1974
 South West Cork Junior B Hurling Championship (6): 1943 (Ballinadee) ,1944 (as Ballinadee), 1945 (as Ballinspittle), 1947, 1962, 1968, 1970
 South West Cork Junior B Football Championship (3): 1951, 1966, 1973
 South West Cork Under-21 A Hurling Championship (1): 1969
 South-East Under 21 "A" Hurling Championship Winners (8) 1980, 1994, 1995, 1996, 1997, 1998, 1999, 2002
 South-East Under 21 "A" Football Championship Winners (1) 2001
 South-East Under 21 "B" Football Championship Winners (2) 2014, 2019
 Cork Senior Camogie Championship (1): 2020

Notable players

Hurling/football
 Jim O'Regan (Kinsale)
 Sean Twomey
 Daire Lordan

Camogie
 Rachel Moloney
 Sara Hayes

References

External links
Official Courcey Rovers website

Gaelic games clubs in County Cork
Gaelic football clubs in County Cork
Hurling clubs in County Cork
1947 establishments in Ireland